Lys Gauty (born Alice Bonnefoux Gauthier, 2 February 1900 – 2 January 1994) was a French cabaret singer and actress. Her most significant work came in the 1930s and 1940s as Gauty appeared in film, and recorded her best-known song, "Le Chaland qui passe", which is an interpretation of an Italian composition.

Biography 
Born in Levallois-Perret, France, Gauty was the daughter of a mechanic and seamstress. Aspiring to be an opera singer, she worked as a shop-girl at a tailor store called the Galeries Lafayette, saving some of her earnings, and portions donated to her by Gauty's parents to receive a classical music education at Nelson Fyscher in Paris. In 1922, Gauty began her musical career as a cabaret singer at variety shows arranged by operetta composer Georges Van Parys, who accompanied her on piano. She married her booking agent, Swiss music director Gaston Groeuer, who had taken over ownership of the Theatre des Dix Heures in Brussels, Belgium. At the music hall, Gauty commenced her successful stretch in Parisian music halls, intermittently performing at the Theatre des Dix Heures for 12 years.

She became a celebrated figure in music halls such as the Olympia, the Empire, the Alcazar, and the ABC. Gauty began recording in 1927, creating her most popular recorded performance in the same year—a French rendition of the Italian love-song, Parlami d'amore Mariù, re-titled Le Chaland qui passe. Beginning in 1930, Gauty started to dabble in cinema soundtracks, singing for Maurice Gleize's Wedding Day. Another notable recording was made into the theme song for René Clair's film Quatorze juillet in 1933. Le Chaland qui passe was also introduced into the 1934 film L'Atalante when it was renamed after the song in an attempt to become more popular among the public.

Gauty was awarded a Grande Prix du Disque for her role in the French adaptation of German composer Kurt Weill's The Threepenny Opera. In addition, Weill supplied her with another of her popular songs, "La Complainte de la Seine". When a period of rampant anti-semitism had spread across France in the mid-1930s, Gauty was one of the few artists to show her support for the Jewish people by singing the composition "Israel, va-t'en". In 1940, following a tour in South America, Gauty returned to France, which had been conquered by Nazi Germany. Under threat of deportation and questioned about her Jewish husband, she, like several other French musicians, agreed to perform in Germany throughout the Second World War. Before the war's conclusion, Gauty had escaped to Monaco where she performed with pianist Léo Ferré, who also composed songs for her.

Upon her return to France, Gauty only briefly continued her music career. Considered as a "collaborator" in the Nazi regime, she was targeted by members of the French Resistance, and survived an assassination attempt. In her later years, Gauty owned a casino in Luchon and became a singing teacher. She died on 2 January 1994 in Cap d'Ail. Her songs have been reissued on compilation albums throughout the years, including Le Chaland qui passe and Lys Gauty: Succès et raretés.

Songs
1928
 Paradis du rêve (Richepin-Fyscher)
 Haine d'amour (Sureau-Bellet)
 Vendetta (Nazelles-Desmoulins-Penso)
 La Tour Saint-Jacques
 Because "I Know You're Mine"
 Tu sais (Berys-Lenoir-Walter-Ervande)
1930
 La Légende des grains de beauté (Boyer-Archambaud)
 Une femme (Blemont-Heine-Lazzari)
 Mais quand c'est toi
 Frileuse
 Déjà
 Le Chaland qui passe (1933), (C.A.Bixio-A.de Badet) song added to a version of the film L'Atalante (Jean Vigo) re-named Le Chaland qui passe for the occasion.
1932
 Valparaiso
 Une Viennoise
 Un coup de riquiqui
 J'aime tes grands yeux
 Chant de Barbara (Kurt Weill-Mauprey
 La Fiancée du pirate (Kurt Weill-Mauprey)
 L'amour qui passe
 Qui j'aime
 Caramba
 Tu m'as fait tant souffrir
 Prends-moi dans tes bras
 Ma chérie
 Coup de soleil
 Si je vous tutoie
1933
 J'aime tes grands yeux
 Les marins de Surcouf
 Le piano mécanique
 Hot Voodoo
 J'ai tout trouvé près de toi
 Je te regarde dormir
 Bye Bye
 Départ (Goener-Tranchant)
 La Ballade du cordonnier (Tranchant)
 C'est le plaisir que j'aime
 Mon cœur est léger
 Loin de toi
 Les deux guitares
 La prière du pauvre homme
 Viens ou L'amour est un caprice
 À Paris dans chaque faubourg (Maurice Jaubert-René Clair), chanson du film Quatorze juillet de René Clair dans lequel elle apparaît.
1934
 Le Bistro du port
 Complainte désabusée
 Rêve d'amour
 Nostalgie
 Libre de moi
 Israël va-t-en
 Chanson de l'escadrille (Arthur Honegger-Joseph Kessel)
 La Complainte de la Seine (Kurt Weill-Maurice Magre)
 Je ne t'aime pas (Kurt Weill-Maurice Magre)
 Un soir d'hiver...tard (Celerier-Pradier)
 Le moulin qui jase (Badet-Bols)
 La Mary Salope
 L'amour tel qu'on le parle
 Dans tes bras doucement
 Chanson du cul de jatte
 L'auto du charbonnier
 Moi et l'Impératrice
 Pour toi je veux rêver
 Les larmes
1935
 Ça sent la friture
 Chéri dis-moi je t'aime (Bos)
 La belle escale
 Je t'aime, c'est tout
 Mirages
 Un jour de différence
 Quel beau dimanche! (Charles Trenet-Groener-Heim)
 Vieille ballade
 Au revoir, bon voyage
 Obsession
 La chanson du brave homme
 Exil
 J'attends un navire (Kurt Weill-Jacques Deval)
 Sammy de la Jamaïque (Goer-Michel Vaucaire)
1936
 Espoir (Wal-Berg/Henneve)
 Sur les bords de la Seine
 J'ai trouvé le bonheur
 Une chanson d'amour
 Certitude
 Colin maillard
 La Marie-Louise
 Manola
1937
 Qu'importe si tu pars
 En souvenir des dimanches
 Sous l'enseigne lumineuse
 Souvenir de bal
 Allons-nous promener
 Tes bras
 Presque rien
 Au revoir et adieu
 Croyez-moi
 Conversation tango
 Le chaland qui reste
 Sans y penser
 L'heure du rêve
 A l'aventure
1938
 Gentiment
 Le Bassin de la Villette (Goer-Michel Vaucaire)
 Y'a de l'amour dans mon cœur
 Une femme, un accordéon, un caboulot
 Ce soir ou bien jamais
 J'ai juré de t'aimer toujours
 Souviens-toi de ce dimanche
 Dis-moi pourquoi ? (Joseph Kosma-Vaucaire-Groener) and Le bonheur est entré dans mon cœur from the film La Goualeuse by Fernand Rivers.
1939
 La valse au village
 Amour en mineur
 Ne voyez-vous pas?
 Tu sais pour qui je chante
 La rosière du régiment
 La belle marinière
 Échanges (Mireille-René Dorin)
1940
 J'écoute la pluie
 Pour vous, Michina
 On me prend pour un ange
 Les petits pavés
 La chanson de Nina
 Les escargots qui vont à l'enterrement (Prévert-Kosma)
1941
 Fumée sur le toit
 Revenir
 La valse de toujours
 Ce jour-là
1942
 Prière au vent du soir
 On en fait vite le tour
 Aujourd'hui, bal de nuit
 Prière au vent du soir
 Pas grand-chose
1943
 Crépuscule (Django Reinhardt-Francis Blanche)
 La chanson que je chante
 La chanson de la rue
 Un soir sur le port
1944
 Échos
1946
 La complainte du corsaire
 En écoutant mon cœur chanter
 Un petit bouquet de violettes
 La chanson du bonheur
 Monde
 La plus belle chanson
1949
 Te voyo benn
 Mon caboulot
1950
 Au fil de la Seine
 Comme un air d'accordéon
1951
 Moi j'aime ça
 Pays perdu
 Mon cœur pleure pour vous
 Y'a tant d'amour
?
 Avec sa pomme
 Mon cœur est fait pour t'aimer
 Infidèle
 Rêver!..
 La garce
 Le bonheur n'est plus un rêve
 Suzon
 La lettre d'un bleu

Bibliography 
 Gianni Lucini, Luci, lucciole e canzoni sotto il cielo di Parigi – Storie di chanteuses nella Francia del primo Novecento), Novara, Segni e Parole, 2014, 160 p.

References

Sources 
 Livret du CD " Lys Gauty ", collection " Les voix d'or ", chez Marianne Melodie.

20th-century French women singers
1900 births
People from Levallois-Perret
1994 deaths